Eleftheroupoli (katharevousa: Ελευθερούπολις - Eleftheroupolis, until 1929 Πράβι - Pravi,) is a town and a former municipality in the Kavala regional unit, East Macedonia and Thrace, Greece. Since the 2011 local government reform it is part of the municipality Pangaio, of which it is the seat and a municipal unit. The municipal unit has an area of 126.974 km2. At the 2011 census, the municipal unit's population was 9,492, the town's population was 4,360.

.

Sister cities
 Antony, France

References

External links
pravi.gr (in Greek)

Populated places in Kavala (regional unit)